Fred Lebow (June 3, 1932 – October 9, 1994), born Fischel Lebowitz, was a runner, race director, and founder of the New York City Marathon. Born in Arad, Romania, he presided over the transformation of the race from one with 55 finishers in 1970 to one of the largest marathons in the world with more than 52,000 finishers in 2018. He was posthumously inducted into the National Distance Running Hall of Fame in 2001.

Lebow ran in the inaugural marathon in 1970, finishing 45th out of 55 runners with a time of 4:12:09. He ran his last NYC Marathon on November 1, 1992 in celebration of his 60th birthday, after being diagnosed with brain cancer in early 1990, with his friend, nine-time NYC Marathon women's winner Grete Waitz of Norway, with a time of 5:32:35.

During his career he completed 69 marathons in 30 countries. Along with the NYC Marathon he also organized the Empire State Building Run-Up, the Fifth Avenue Mile, and the CrazyLegs Mini Marathon (a 10K road race), which was the first strictly women-only road race. Lebow was also president of New York Road Runners for twenty years.

Death

His memorial service at the finish line of the New York City Marathon attracted a crowd of more than 3,000 mourners, which at that time was the largest memorial gathering in Central Park since the death of John Lennon.

Legacy
In 1991, Lebow established Fred's Friends as the first official charity of the New York Marathon. The program uses marathon runners to raise funds for cancer research.

In 1995, Fred's Team was established in honor of Lebow.  Every year, athletes of all abilities join Fred's Team to compete in marathons, half-marathons, triathlons, bike races, and other endurance events around the world to raise funds for pioneering research at Memorial Sloan-Kettering Cancer Center. As of 2018, Fred's Team had raised more than $87 million.

In Lebow's honor, a sculpture of him was created by Jesus Ygnacio Dominguez. Unveiled on November 4, 1994, it depicts Lebow timing runners with his watch. In 2001, the statue was moved to its permanent location on the East Side Central Park Drive at 90th St. Every year the statue is moved to a spot in view of the finish line of the marathon.

New York Road Runners hosts an annual race called the Fred Lebow Half-Marathon in January, consisting of 13.1 miles in 2 loops of Central Park.

In popular culture
The documentary Run for Your Life tells the story of Lebow and the New York City Marathon.

References
Notes

Sources
USATF Hall of Fame Bio (archived)

External links

Run for Your Life - Documentary film about the life of Fred Lebow (archived)
Fred Lebow in the National Distance Running Hall of Fame (archived)
Fred Lebow's Race To The Finish
Fred Lebow's last NY marathon (archived)

1932 births
1994 deaths
Burials at Mount Hebron Cemetery (New York City)
American people of Romanian-Jewish descent
Jewish American sportspeople
Romanian emigrants to the United States
Romanian Jews
Sportspeople from Arad, Romania
20th-century American Jews